Mycenology is the study of the Mycenaean Greek language and the culture and institutions recorded in that language. It emerged as a discipline auxiliary to classical philology in 1953, following the deciphering of Minoan Linear B script by Alice Kober, Michael Ventris and John Chadwick.

References

 
Philology